Axis Lines International was a start-up airline planned to be based in Douala, Cameroon. It was intended to fly regional services with two McDonnell Douglas MD-80 aircraft and international services to Brussels, Madrid and Paris with a Boeing 767-300ER.

History
The predecessor of Axis Lines International was Axis International Lines, a Cameroon-based airline that was operational in 2005 and 2006. When bankruptcy was declared, some of the old staff and former Cameroon Airlines staff tried to raise a new airline under a slightly different name in late 2006. Further help came from local and Spanish investors.

Axis Lines International never became operational.  There was never a formal declaration of bankruptcy, but airline and staff have completely dissolved.

References

External links
Axis Lines International (site under construction)

Defunct airlines of Cameroon
Airlines established in 2006
Companies based in Douala